Luke Yendle (born 27 June 2000) is a Welsh rugby union player, currently playing for Pro14 side Dragons. His preferred position is prop.

Dragons
Yendle was named in the Dragons transition squad for the 2020–21 Pro14 season. He made his Dragons debut in Round 1 of the 2020–21 European Rugby Champions Cup against Wasps.

References

External links
itsrugby.co.uk Profile

2000 births
Living people
Welsh rugby union players
Dragons RFC players
Rugby union props
Jersey Reds players